The 1955 Polish Speedway season was the 1955 season of motorcycle speedway in Poland.

Individual

Polish Individual Speedway Championship
The 1955 Individual Speedway Polish Championship was held over four legs.

Rybnik, 26 May 
Leszno, 21 August
Bydgoszcz, 30 October
Wrocław, 6 November

Team

Team Speedway Polish Championship
The 1955 Team Speedway Polish Championship was the eighth edition of the Team Polish Championship.

The Second League returned after a three year absence. In First and Second League, matches were played with part two teams, with it playing it matches return. Teams were made up of six drivers plus two reserves. The score of heat: 3–2–1–0. Mecz consisted with 9 heats. For winning a game a team received 2 points, draw – 1 point, loss – 0 points. The drivers from main squad started in the match three times. The quantity of small points was added up.

First League 

Medalists

Second League

References

Poland Individual
Poland Team
Speedway